Two Creeks is a town in Manitowoc County, Wisconsin, United States. The population was 551 at the 2000 census.

Communities 

 Two Creeks is a defunct community located on the east end of Two Creeks Road. A fire from a blacksmith destroyed much of the original site in October 1918. The site is now Two Creeks County Park.
 West Two Creeks (signed by WISDOT as Two Creeks) is an unincorporated community at the intersection of WIS 42 and Two Creeks Road.

Geography
According to the United States Census Bureau, the town has a total area of 14.9 square miles (38.5 km2), all of it land.

Two Creeks is located on the shore of Lake Michigan. The Two Creeks Buried Forest State Natural Area is located north of the town.

Demographics
As of the census of 2000, there were 551 people, 184 households, and 151 families residing in the town. The population density was 37.0 people per square mile (14.3/km2). There were 202 housing units at an average density of 13.6 per square mile (5.2/km2). The racial makeup of the town was 98.55% White, 0.36% Native American, 0.18% Pacific Islander, 0.91% from other races. Hispanic or Latino of any race were 1.45% of the population.

There were 184 households, out of which 37.0% had children under the age of 18 living with them, 67.9% were married couples living together, 7.6% had a female householder with no husband present, and 17.9% were non-families. 14.1% of all households were made up of individuals, and 7.1% had someone living alone who was 65 years of age or older. The average household size was 2.99 and the average family size was 3.28.

In the town, the population was spread out, with 32.7% under the age of 18, 4.2% from 18 to 24, 29.8% from 25 to 44, 20.9% from 45 to 64, and 12.5% who were 65 years of age or older. The median age was 36 years. For every 100 females, there were 109.5 males. For every 100 females age 18 and over, there were 112.0 males.

The median income for a household in the town was $45,625, and the median income for a family was $50,625. Males had a median income of $30,875 versus $22,188 for females. The per capita income for the town was $17,007. About 4.7% of families and 3.9% of the population were below the poverty line, including 2.7% of those under age 18 and 8.7% of those age 65 or over.

Economy
The Point Beach Nuclear Plant is located in the town.

History
The town celebrated their sesquicentennial on August 15, 2009.

References

External links 
Town of Two Creeks
 

Towns in Manitowoc County, Wisconsin
Towns in Wisconsin